Qarah Qayah-ye Shakarlu (also Romanized as Qarah Qayah-ye Shakarlū; also known as Qarah Qayah) is a village in Chahardangeh Rural District, Hurand District, Ahar County, East Azerbaijan Province, Iran. At the 2006 census, its population was 602, in 103 families.

References 

Populated places in Ahar County